Ozvar (also Romanized as Ozvār, Azvār, and Azwār; also known as Owzvār) is a village in Golab Rural District, Barzok District, Kashan County, Isfahan Province, Iran. At the 2006 census, its population was 727, in 216 families.

References 

Populated places in Kashan County